Fátima Gallardo Carapeto (born 24 May 1997) is a Spanish swimmer. She competed in the women's 4 × 100 metre freestyle relay event at the 2016 Summer Olympics.

References

External links
 

1997 births
Living people
Spanish female freestyle swimmers
Olympic swimmers of Spain
Swimmers at the 2016 Summer Olympics
Place of birth missing (living people)
21st-century Spanish women